Attanagh railway station served the village of Attanagh in County Laois, Ireland.

The station opened on 1 March 1865. Passenger services were withdrawn on 1 January 1963 by CIÉ.

History
Opened by the Kilkenny Junction Railway, by the beginning of the 20th century the station was run by the Great Southern and Western Railway. It was absorbed into the Great Southern Railways in 1925.

The station was then nationalised, passing on to Córas Iompair Éireann as a result of the Transport Act 1944 which took effect from 1 January 1945. It was closed in 1963.

References

Further reading

External links

Disused railway stations in County Laois
Railway stations opened in 1865
Railway stations closed in 1963